The 1947 Soviet Chess Championship was the 15th edition of USSR Chess Championship. Held from 2 February to 8 March 1947 in Leningrad. The tournament was won by Paul Keres. Mikhail Botvinnik was absent as a sign of his displeasure over the lack of good faith by the Soviet authorities in negotiating for a World Championship match-tournament.

Tables and results

References 

USSR Chess Championships
Championship
Chess
1947 in chess
Chess